Tess Jones is a male singer songwriter based in the UK.

His album Magpie was released on 25 October 2010 and was mastered by Simon Heyworth (Nick Drake, Brian Eno) and produced by Howard Gott. The album is distributed by Cadiz Music via Universal Music. It is available worldwide for download or in the UK on CD. Tess Jones is currently singer, guitarist and frontman of band Tess Of The Circle.

The album has been reviewed in MOJO, The Independent (IndyChoice: best new music), and Acoustic Magazine amongst others. His songs and live performances have been featured on several BBC Radio programs. In 2010, TESS was runner-up (2nd place) in The People's Music Awards Best Male Solo Artist category.

Albums

Magpie

Track listing
 Big Room
 The Warren
 Elliott
 Magpie
 Save me from myself
 Lullaby for Maisy Jane
 River
 Springtime
 Blame the Capulet
 Living in a state of
 The Reprise

Singles
 "Big Room" – released 3 January 2011

References

 TESS interview with Artist Connection Podcast

External links

 

1972 births
Living people
English folk musicians